Noël Martin (1959 – 14 July 2020) was a Jamaican-born British man, victim of a neo-Nazi attack in 1996. On 16 June 1996 in Brandenburg, Germany, he was attacked because of his dark skin by neo-Nazis. A block of concrete was thrown through the windshield of his car and his car veered off the road and struck a tree.

Martin became a quadriplegic as a result of the attack, and required 24-hour care. Having outlived his wife, he announced his intention to seek assisted suicide, to take place in Berlin, as a result. His first announcement, in 2006, set 23 June 2007 as the date of his suicide. As of December 2007 he had made arrangements with a doctor through the Swiss organization Dignitas.

A documentary film about Martin, The Finishing Line, directed and produced by Estephan Wagner, was due to be shown on Channel 4 in August 2009. However, Martin objected to the inclusion of two scenes (referred to in court as the "hoisting" and "song" scenes), and sought an injunction against Channel 4 preventing them from broadcasting it. In November 2009, Mr Justice Eady rejected Martin's application.

Martin died on 14 July 2020, at the age of 60.

References

External links
German article in the Frankfurter Allgemeine Zeitung

1959 births
2020 deaths
English people of Jamaican descent
Hate crimes
Euthanasia in the United Kingdom
Neo-Nazi attacks in Germany
People with tetraplegia